Long Lost Lake is located in Clearwater County, Minnesota, United States. The closed-basin lake's waterlevel rose from 489 m in 1991 to 491 m in 2001.

External links
 
 
http://longlostlake.com
Waterlevels (1992-2006)

Lakes of Clearwater County, Minnesota
Lakes of Minnesota